Fruit Valley is a postal hamlet within the city of Oswego, New York, United States, located on Route 104. It lies in the easternmost section of the city and borders Hannibal to the west and the State University of New York at Oswego to the east.  Its post office is located on the site of the first log cabin of the city of Oswego, erected in 1797 by Asa Rice, the founder of Oswego. Fruit Valley is sometimes referred to as "Union Village", the city's original name.

References 
 http://history.rays-place.com//ny/oswego-ny.htm

Hamlets in New York (state)
Syracuse metropolitan area
Hamlets in Oswego County, New York
Populated places on Lake Ontario in the United States